Guyot Hill is a mountain located in the Shawangunk Mountains of New York, south of High Falls. Bonticou Crag is located east-northeast of Guyot Hill.

References

Mountains of Ulster County, New York
Mountains of New York (state)